In mathematics, the closed-subgroup theorem (sometimes referred to as Cartan's theorem) is a theorem in the theory of Lie groups. It states that if  is a closed subgroup of a Lie group , then  is an embedded Lie group with the smooth structure (and hence the group topology) agreeing with the embedding.
One of several results known as Cartan's theorem, it was first published in 1930 by Élie Cartan, who was inspired by John von Neumann's 1929 proof of a special case for groups of linear transformations.

Overview
Let  be a Lie group with Lie algebra . The challenge is that  is not assumed to have any smoothness and therefore it is not clear how one may define its tangent space.

If, for example,  were some large subgroup of  but  turned out to be zero,  would not be helpful.

The key step, then, is to show that  actually captures all the elements of  that are sufficiently close to the identity. That is to say, it is necessary to prove the following critical lemma:

That is to say, in exponential coordinates near the identity,  looks like . Thus, we have exhibited a "slice coordinate system" in which  looks locally like , which is the condition for an embedded submanifold.

Rossmann then goes on to introduce coordinates on  that make the identity component of  into a Lie group. It is important to note, however, that the topology on  coming from these coordinates is not the subset topology.

In particular, the lemma stated above does not hold if  is not closed.

Example of a non-closed subgroup

For an example of a subgroup that is not an embedded Lie subgroup, consider the torus and an "irrational winding of the torus".

and its subgroup

with  irrational. This means that  is not locally path connected.

The group  is not a Lie group. While the map  is an analytic bijection, its inverse is not continuous. That is, if  corresponds to a small open interval , there is no open  with  due to the appearance of the sets . However, with the group topology ,  is a Lie group. With this topology the injection  is an analytic injective immersion, but not a homeomorphism, hence not an embedding. For closed subgroups this is not the case as the proof below of the theorem shows.

Applications 

In this setting, one proves that every element of the group sufficiently close to the identity is the exponential of an element of the Lie algebra. (The proof is practically identical to the proof of the closed subgroup theorem presented below.) It follows every closed subgroup is an embedded submanifold of 

The closed subgroup theorem now simplifies the hypotheses considerably, a priori widening the class of homogeneous spaces. Every closed subgroup yields a homogeneous space.

In a similar way, the closed subgroup theorem simplifies the hypothesis in the following theorem.
If  is a set with transitive group action and the isotropy group or stabilizer of a point  is a closed Lie subgroup, then  has a unique smooth manifold structure such that the action is smooth.

Conditions for being closed
A few sufficient conditions for  being closed, hence an embedded Lie group, are given below.
A subgroup that is locally closed is closed.
Let  be a Lie subalgebra.

Converse 

An embedded Lie subgroup  is closed so a subgroup is an embedded Lie subgroup if and only if it is closed. Equivalently,  is an embedded Lie subgroup if and only if its group topology equals its relative topology.

Proof 

Historically, this case was proven first, by John von Neumann in 1929, and inspired Cartan to prove the full closed subgroup theorem in 1930.

Proof of the key lemma
We begin by establishing the key lemma stated in the "overview" section above.

Expand the exponentials,

, the identity. It remains to show that  and  contain open sets  and  such that the conclusion of the theorem holds.

Suppose for the purpose of obtaining a contradiction that for all ,  contains an element  that is not on the form .

The index  henceforth refers to this subsequence. It will be shown that . For example,  such that  will do, as  → 0. Then

Since  is closed, hence . This is a contradiction. Hence, for some  the sets  and  satisfy  and the exponential restricted to the open set  is in analytic bijection with the open set . This proves the lemma.

Proof of the theorem
This is, by the way it is constructed, a neighborhood basis both in the group topology and the relative topology. These bases restricted to  gives neighborhood bases at all . The topology generated by these bases is the relative topology. The conclusion is that the relative topology is the same as the group topology.

First define . This is an analytic bijection with analytic inverse. Furthermore, if , then . This shows that  is a slice chart.

See also 
Inverse function theorem
Lie correspondence

Notes

References 
. See in particular p. 441.

Lie groups
Theorems in group theory